Willie Lorenzo Shaw (born January 11, 1944) is a retired American football player and coach who coached for a number of NFL and college football teams. He is the father of former Stanford head coach David Shaw.

Early life and playing career
Born in Glenmora, Louisiana, Shaw served in the United States Air Force after graduating from Lincoln High School in San Diego. Serving in the Vietnam War, Shaw rose to the rank of Sergeant. Shaw later worked on jets at an electronics company before enrolling at the University of New Mexico. From 1966 to 1968, Shaw lettered in football for the New Mexico Lobos and was an All-Western Athletic Conference cornerback and an All-America honorable mention cornerback. Shaw then transferred to San Diego State University, where he did not play football but earned his bachelor's degree in physical education in 1971 and later a master's degree in physical education in 1973.

Coaching career
Following his playing career, Shaw began a long career as an assistant coach at a number of college and NFL teams, coaching defenses either as a secondary coach or defensive coordinator. Shaw coached for a total of 14 teams, with his longest NFL stints occurring with the Minnesota Vikings (two separate stints) and the Detroit Lions; collegiately, his longest tenures were at Stanford (two separate stints) and at Arizona State. In his second stint at Stanford, he was a finalist for the head coach position in 1992 that eventually went to Bill Walsh.

Personal life
Shaw is the father of former Stanford head coach David Shaw and the brother of 1960s USC safety Nate Shaw.

References

1944 births
Living people
American football cornerbacks
Arizona State Sun Devils football coaches
Detroit Lions coaches
Kansas City Chiefs coaches
Long Beach State 49ers football coaches
Minnesota Vikings coaches
National Football League defensive coordinators
New Mexico Lobos football players
New Orleans Saints coaches
Oakland Raiders coaches
Oregon Ducks football coaches
Stanford Cardinal football coaches
San Diego Chargers coaches
St. Louis Rams coaches
Junior college football coaches in the United States
High school football coaches in California
San Diego State University alumni
Players of American football from San Diego
People from Rapides Parish, Louisiana
African-American coaches of American football
African-American players of American football
21st-century African-American people
20th-century African-American sportspeople